Xanthium ambrosioides, the Argentine cocklebur, is a species of flowering plant in the family Asteraceae, native to Argentina, and introduced to Great Britain, France, Italy, and New South Wales. Some authorities consider it a synonym of Xanthium spinosum. It is a "Declared Pest, Prohibited" in Western Australia.

References

ambrosioides
Endemic flora of Argentina
Plants described in 1841